Albert Edward Lewis (20 January 1877 – 22 February 1956), known as "Talbot Lewis", was an English first-class cricketer who played for Somerset between 1899 and 1912. He reappeared for Somerset in one match after the start of the First World War in August 1914, although he played under an assumed name, A. Key. 

An allrounder, Lewis was a middle to lower order batsman and right-arm fast-medium pace bowler.
He scored 9 first-class hundreds, his highest was an unbeaten 201 against Kent in 1909 after he'd made a duck in his first innings. Somerset followed on and Lewis's innings earned them a draw. With the ball he took over 500 wickets for Somerset and took his best innings bowling figures of 8 for 103 against Warwickshire in 1908, finishing the match with 14 wickets.

Football career
Lewis also played professional football as a goalkeeper with Sheffield United, Sunderland, Leicester Fosse and Bristol City amongst others.

References

External links
 
 

1877 births
1956 deaths
English cricketers
Somerset cricketers
Bedminster F.C. players
Bristol City F.C. players
Everton F.C. players
Walsall F.C. players
Sheffield United F.C. players
Sunderland A.F.C. players
Luton Town F.C. players
Leicester City F.C. players
English Football League players
West of England cricketers
Association football goalkeepers
English footballers